Adeel Razzaq is a Pakistani writer . He is best known for his debut drama series Muqaddas (2015) and Deewana (2016), both aired on Hum TV. He received his first Best TV Writer nomination at 15th Lux Style Awards for Muqaddas. He is a head of content on Larachi Entertainment and a freelance writer at Geo Entertainment.

Filmography

Television

  Muqaddas (2015) 
 Deewana (2016)
 Kitni Girhain Baaqi Hain (Episode 14) (2017)
 Pukaar (2018)
 Thora Sa Haq (2019)
 Dulhan (2020)
 Bharaas (2020–21)
 Neeli Zinda Hai (2021)
 Mushkil (2022)
 Sar-e-rah (2023)

Awards and nominations

 2016: Lux Style Award for Best TV Writer - Nominated.

References

Living people
Pakistani television writers
People from Karachi
Year of birth missing (living people)